Indrani Bose (born 15 August 1951) is an Indian physicist, senior Professor at Department of Physics, Bose Institute, Kolkata. Her fields of specialization are in theoretical condensed matter, quantum information theory, statistical physics, biological physics and systems.

Education 
Bose obtained her Ph.D. (Physics) in 1981 from Rajabazar Science College, University of Calcutta.

Career 
Bose's research interests include the problem of quantum many body systems, quantum information theory, statistical mechanics and systems biology.

She is a fellow of the Indian Academy of Sciences, Bangalore and of the National Academy of Sciences, Allahabad. She also developed a strong solid-state theory group in the Bose Institute.

Awards 
Bose was the first recipient of the Stree Shakthi Science Samman award (2000) for her work on exact solutions of model Hamiltonian (low dimensions) in the context of magnetic systems.

References

1951 births
Living people
Scientists from Kolkata
University of Calcutta alumni
Indian theoretical physicists
Bengali physicists
Indian women physicists
20th-century Indian physicists
20th-century Indian women scientists
Women scientists from West Bengal